In hydrology, a current in a stream or other water body is the flow of water influenced by gravity as the water moves downhill to reduce its potential energy. The current varies spatially as well as temporally within the stream, dependent upon the flow volume of water, stream gradient, and channel geometry. In tidal zones, the current and streams may reverse on the flood tide before resuming on the ebb tide.

The term upstream (or upriver) refers to the direction towards the source of the stream (or river), i.e. against the direction of flow. Likewise, the term downstream or downriver describes the direction towards the mouth of the stream or river, in which the current flows. The term "left bank" and "right bank" refers to banks as seen from the direction of flow.

See also
 
 
 
 
 
 

Coastal geography
Hydrology
Rivers
Water streams